Sophronia alaicella is a moth of the family Gelechiidae. It was described by Aristide Caradja in 1920. It is found in the Alay Mountains in central Asia.

References

Moths described in 1920
Sophronia (moth)